is a Japanese manga series written and illustrated by Masami Yuki. It was serialized in Shogakukan's seinen manga magazine Weekly Big Comic Spirits from August 2013 to May 2017.

Publication
Hakubo no Chronicle is written and illustrated by Masami Yuki. The series ran in Shogakukan's seinen manga magazine Weekly Big Comic Spirits from August 26, 2013 to May 29, 2017.<ref></p></ref><ref></p></ref> Shogakukan collected its chapters in eleven tankōbon volumes, released from March 30, 2014 to June 30, 2017.

Volume list

Reception
Hakubo no Chronicle placed 14th on Takarajimasha's Kono Manga ga Sugoi! 2015 ranking of top 20 manga for male readers, and placed 20th on the 2016 ranking. It was nominated for the 49th Seiun Award for the Best Comic category in 2018.

References

Further reading

External links
 

Masami Yuki
Mystery anime and manga
Seinen manga
Shogakukan manga